Gianni Baget Bozzo (8 March 1925 – 8 May 2009) was an Italian Catholic priest and politician.

Baget Bozzo was born in Savona and raised in Genoa where he graduated in law. At one-time Christian-Democrat activist, in 1984 he was elected at the European Parliament for the Italian Socialist Party and from 1994 he had been a member of Silvio Berlusconi's Forza Italia party. In theology he was a follower of Joseph Ratzinger's theories.

Bozzo died in Genoa, aged 84.

Works
Giovanni Baget Bozzo, Cristianesimo e ordine civile, Roma, Edizioni romane Mame, 1962.
Giovanni Baget-Bozzo, Il Cristianesimo nell'eta postmoderna, Torino, CET, 1962.
Problemi della politica italiana / a cura di Giovanni Baget-Bozzo, Nicola Guiso, Paolo Possenti, Roma, Tip. editrice romana, 1963.
Gianni Baget Bozzo, Claudio Leonardi, Il tempo dell'Apocalisse, Roma, 1968 (pro ms.)
Gianni Baget Bozzo, Chiesa e utopia, Bologna, Il Mulino, 1971.
Gianni Baget Bozzo, Cristianesimo e antropologia, Padova, Rebellato, 1971.
La vita quotidiana del cristiano, Atti del 7. Convegno di teologia pastorale organizzato dalla rivista Studi cattolici sul tema Per una pastorale della vita quotidiana: 24-27 luglio 1972, saggi di G. Baget-Bozzo e altri, Milano, Ares, 1973.
Gianni Baget Bozzo, Il partito cristiano al potere: la DC di De Gasperi e di Dossetti 1945-1954, Firenze, Vallecchi, 1974.
Gianni Baget Bozzo, Il partito cristiano e l'apertura a sinistra: la DC di Fanfani e di Moro 1954-1962, Firenze, Vallecchi, 1977.
Gianni Baget Bozzo, Il partito cristiano, il comunismo e la società radicale, Firenze, Vallecchi, 1977.
Gianni Baget Bozzo, I cattolici e la lettera di Berlinguer, Firenze, Vallecchi, 1978.
Gianni Baget Bozzo, Democrazia cristiana, Moro, «partito americano», in Argomenti radicali, n, 10, 1978.
Gianni Baget Bozzo, L'elefante e la balena. Cronache del compromesso e del confronto, Bologna, Cappelli, 1979.
Gianni Baget Bozzo, Questi cattolici. Intervista di Carlo Cardia, Editori Riuniti, 1979.
Gianni Baget Bozzo, La chiesa e la cultura radicale, Queriniana, 1979.
Gianni Baget Bozzo e altri, I socialisti e la questione cattolica, Milano, Mondo Operaio-Avanti, 1979.
Religiosi e laici di fronte all'apocalisse / un saggio di Ernesto Balducci ; conversazioni con Gianni Baget Bozzo e altri; conversazioni a cura di Gaetano Besana e Pino Mercuri, Milano, Edizioni dell'apocalisse, 1979.
Gianni Baget Bozzo, La Trinità, Firenze, Vallecchi, 1980.
Gianni Baget Bozzo, Tesi sulla DC. Rinasce la questione nazionale, Bologna, Cappelli, 1980.
Gianni Baget Bozzo, Di fronte all'Islam. Il grande conflitto, Marietti, 1980.
Gianni Baget Bozzo, Edoardo Benvenuto, La conoscenza di Dio, Edizioni Borla, 1980.
Gianni Baget Bozzo, L'anticristo, Mondadori, 1980.
Gianni Baget Bozzo, Ortodossia e liberazione. Un'interpretazione di Papa Wojtyla, Milano, Rizzoli, 1980.
Gianni Baget Bozzo, L' ultimo giorno è più vicino, Genesi, 1980.
Gianni Baget Bozzo e altri, Processo alla politica, Roma, Lavoro, 1980.
Io e la morte, introduzione di Osvaldo G.V. Piccardo; uno scritto di Barbara Alberti; conversazioni con Gianni Baget Bozzo e altri; a cura di Pino Mercuri, Milano, Apocalisse, 1980.
Sette utopie americane : l'architettura del socialismo comunitario : 1790-1975,  Dolores Hayden ; con in appendice uno scritto di Gianni Baget-Bozzo
Milano : Feltrinelli, 1980.
Gianni Baget Bozzo, Dal sacro al mistico. Parlare del Cristianesimo come se fosse la prima volta, Feltrinelli, 1981.
Gianni Baget Bozzo, Edoardo Benvenuto, La figura e il Regno, Vallecchi, 1981.
Nonviolenza e marxismo nella transizione al socialismo, convegno a Perugia nell'ottobre 1978; a cura della Fondazione Centro studi Aldo Capitini e del Movimento nonviolento; con scritti di Gianni Baget Bozzo e altri. Milano, Feltrinelli, 1981.
Gianni Baget Bozzo, Vocazione, Milano, Rizzoli, 1982.
Gianni Baget Bozzo, Il futuro viene dal futuro. Ipotesi sui cattolici e sui democristiani, Editori Riuniti, 1982.
Gianni Baget Bozzo, Giovanni Tassani, Aldo Moro: il politico nella crisi, 1962-1973, Firenze, Sansoni, 1983.
Critica della crisi, Gianfranco Albertelli, Gianfranco Ferrari ; saggi di Gianni Baget-Bozzo e altri, Trento, L. Reverdito, 1983.
Gianni Baget Bozzo in collaborazione con Giorgio Sacchi, Manuale di mistica, Milano, Rizzoli, 1984.
Gianni Baget Bozzo, E Dio creò Dio, Milano, Rizzoli, 1985.
Gianni Baget Bozzo e altri, Il pensiero strategico,  a cura di Carlo Jean, Milano, F. Angeli, 1985.
Gianni Baget Bozzo, Prima del bene e del male, Milano, Rizzoli, 1987.
Gianni Baget Bozzo, Michele Genovese, Europa : una speranza contro la ragione, Trento, L. Reverdito, 1987.
Gianni Baget Bozzo, I tempi e l'eterno. Intervista su un'esperienza teologica, a cura di Claudio Leonardi e Giovanni Tassani. Genova, Marietti, 1988.
Gianni Baget Bozzo, L' uomo l' angelo il demone, Milano, Rizzoli, 1989.
Gianni Baget Bozzo, Michele Genovese, 1992 : come convivere con il grande mercato, Trento, L. Reverdito, 1989.
Gianni Baget Bozzo, Michele Genovese, L'Europa nel declino degli imperi : dopo Yalta, la Germania?, Venezia, Marsilio, 1990.
L'Autunno del diavolo : "Diabolos, dialogos, daimon", convegno di Torino 17-21 ottobre 1988, a cura di Eugenio Corsini e altri; testi di Baget Bozzo e altri. Milano, Bompiani, 1990.
Morte e riscoperta dello stato-nazione, a cura di Carlo Jean; con scritti di Gianni Baget Bozzo e altri. Milano, Franco Angeli, 1991.
Gianni Baget Bozzo, Fabrizio Gualco, Le metamorfosi della cristianità: Chiesa, socialismo, società tecnologica, SugarCo, 1991.
Luoghi del Seicento genovese : spazi architettonici, spazi dipinti, a cura di Liliana Pittarello; con scritti di Gianni Baget Bozzo e altri. Bologna, Nuova Alfa, 1992.
Gianni Baget Bozzo, La nuova terra, Milano, Rizzoli, 1993.
Gianni Baget Bozzo, Cattolici e democristiani, Milano, Rizzoli, 1994.
Gianni Baget Bozzo, Dio e l' Occidente: lo sguardo nel divino, Milano, Leonardo, c1995.
Gianni Baget Bozzo, Buona domenica. Anno A, EDB, 1995.
Gianni Baget Bozzo, Buona domenica. Anno B, EDB, 1996.
Gianni Baget Bozzo, Buona domenica. Anno C, EDB, 1997.
Gianni Baget Bozzo, Il futuro del cattolicesimo. La Chiesa dopo papa Wojtyla, Casale Monferrato, Piemme, 1997.
Gianni Baget Bozzo, La cultura politica di Forza Italia : il liberalismo popolare, Como, Malinverno, 1997.
Gianni Baget Bozzo, Il Dio perduto, Mondadori, 1999.
Sopravviverà la Chiesa nel terzo millennio? / Pier Michele Girola, Gian Luca Mazzini;  rispondono: Gianni Baget Bozzo e altri; con un saggio introduttivo di Franco Cardini, Milano, Edizioni Paoline, 1999.
Gianni Baget Bozzo, Come sono arrivato a Berlusconi. Dal PSI di Craxi a Forza Italia. Fede, Chiesa e religione, Marco, 2001.
Gianni Baget Bozzo e altri, La navicella della metafisica : dibattito sul nichilismo e la Terza navigazione, Roma, Armando, 2000.
Gianni Baget Bozzo, Claudio Leonardi, Homo Dei. Resoconto di un'esperienza mistica, SISMEL - Edizioni del Galluzzo, 2001.
Gianni Baget Bozzo, Di fronte all'islam : il grande conflitto, Genova, Marietti, 2001.
Gianni Baget Bozzo, con Marco Vannini e altri (ed.), Mistica d'Oriente e Occidente oggi, Milano, Paoline, 2001.
Gianni Baget Bozzo, Profezia. Il Cristianesimo non è una religione, Milano, Mondadori, 2002.
Gianni Baget Bozzo, Io credo. Il simbolo della fede parola per parola-Lettera a un vescovo su «Chiesa e Occidente», Mondadori, 2003.
Gianni Baget Bozzo, Alessandro Di Chiara, Cristo e/o Chiesa, Àncora, 2003.
Gianni Baget Bozzo, L' impero d' Occidente. La storia ritorna, Lindau, 2004.
Gianni Baget Bozzo, L'intreccio. Cattolici e comunisti 1945-2004, Mondadori, 2004.
Gianni Baget Bozzo, Verità dimenticate. Vita eterna, anima, escatologia, Àncora, 2005.
Gianni Baget Bozzo, Vocazione: mistica e libertà, Lindau, 2005.
Gianni Baget Bozzo, Raffaele Iannuzzi, Tra nichilismo e Islam. L'Europa come colpa, Mondadori, 2006.
Maria, l'Apocalisse e il Medioevo, Atti del III incontro di Mariologia medievale (Parma, 10-11 maggio 2002) / a cura di Clelia Maria Piastra e Francesco Santi; con scritti di Gianni Baget Bozzo: L'Immacolata Concezione e la coscienza mistica, e altri. Firenze, SISMEL, 2006.

1925 births
2009 deaths
People from Savona
Christian Democracy (Italy) politicians
Forza Italia politicians
Italian Socialist Party MEPs
MEPs for Italy 1984–1989
20th-century Italian Roman Catholic priests